Ayhan Kartal (born Ayhan Korniş, 1966 – March 13, 2000) was a Turkish rapist and child killer. He was stabbed to death by his roommates in a mental hospital.

Crimes
On April 20, 1985, Ayhan Korniş killed the 13-year-old Armağan Kayadipli by strangling him after he raped him in the İkiçeşmelik quarter of Kemeraltı district in Izmir. He was placed in a mental hospital in Bakırköy, Istanbul, and was released following about one-year long psychiatric treatment. He changed his surname from Korniş to Kartal.

On September 23, 1989, Kartal raped and killed the 9-year-old boy Barış Kurt in Şirinyer, Izmir. He was apprehended while he was hiding in a chest at his home at Pınarbaşı, Bornova in Izmir.

In 1992, Kartal was transferred to Manisa Psychiatric Hospital for the diagnosis and treatment of his mental disorder. He escaped from the hospital on October 14, 1993, but was apprehended after a while in Izmir, and brought back to the hospital. He confessed to the authorities that "he feels himself close to children, and he can have intercourse with children only". He was nicknamed "The Beast of Izmir".

Death
In the mental hospital, Kartal was afraid of the serial killer Süleyman Aktaş, nicknamed "The Nailing Killer", with whom he shared the same ward. After a while, he was relocated to another ward following his request. In the night of March 13, 2000, Kartal was stabbed once in the throat and three times in the stomach by his two roommates, the serial killer Ali Kaya (23), nicknamed "The Babyface Killer", and Tayfun Şahin (32), in the 17-people hospital ward. The physician on duty found him with wounds in blood, and arranged his transfer to an emergency station after persuading and passivating the two offenders. Kartal died underway.

References

1966 births
2000 deaths
Deaths by stabbing in Turkey
People from İzmir
Murdered criminals
Turkish rapists
Turkish murder victims
Turkish murderers of children
Turkish murderers
Victims of serial killers
Violence against men in Asia